Ongacious is predominantly a Nigerian family magazine show with a special culinary slant; studio production format (with sprinkling of location shoot).

The show is a weekly culinary magazine show, which is targeted at families. On each episode, there will be a mix of content that appeals to the whole family, from aerobics to wellness to family talk to meal of the day, to City in Focus documentary, music from the band and the studio audience.

The Hosts will coordinate the various segments on the show with refreshing music from the live band.

Segments

Wellness (Pre-recorded) 
The health benefits of regular exercise and physical activity are hard to ignore. Everyone benefits from exercise, regardless of age, gender or physical ability. Hence this segment takes viewers through scheduled routine of exercise (majorly dance routines) with the aim of reducing stress and achieving a healthier lifestyle.

Healthy living (Pre-recorded, but simulated as a Skype call) 
Medical personnel from recognized institutions will be invited for a live chat on various medical conditions/issues and advise on the various healthy ways of preventing/managing these conditions. Topics could include diabetes, obesity in children, low blood pressure, etc.

Family Talk (Live on set) 
A consultant is invited on the show based on specific topical family issues and expert analysis is done on these issues with advices/references given. Topics could range from relationships with in-laws, couple’s joint bank account, bullying, peer pressure etc.

City in Fokus (CIF) 
Here, the guest cook and celebrity guest from the CIF are introduced. There is a conversation between the guest cook (who is a fan of the celebrity guest) and the hosts before the celebrity guest is introduced to the anxious guest cook and audience. There is meant to be a connection between the guest cook and the celebrity guest. The Docufeature is being played so as to create a familiar platform for the guest cook and celebrity guest.

 Guest Cook: From the CIF that has been profiled, the shortlisted candidates (based on recipe earlier supplied), who could be indigenous to that community, married, lived or schooled there, would then be invited on set to prepare the meal of the day.
 Celebrity Guest: The celebrity (actors, actresses, artists, sport personnel, photographers, models, blogger, fashion designers, makeup artists, TV personalities etc.) with a very strong relationship with the city in focus (indigenous to that community, married, lived or schooled there) is invited on the show to the surprise of the guest cook and studio audience, to add spice to the show.

Meal of the day 
After having a few conversations with the hosts and guests, the guest cooks and celebrity guest proceeds into the kitchen to prepare the meal of the day. A local meal from the CIF is prepared in a healthy way using the different varieties of Onga seasonings for the celebrity guests to savour. Music is dished out by the live band to the enjoyment of the guest and audience seated.

The show ends with the Approval of the meal by the Celebrity and the Host signs off the show, with the band playing music while they continue to enjoy their meal.

Season 1 
The first season of Ongacious kicked off on Saturday 7 April 2018, and is shown on several stations across Nigeria including DSTV, African Magic, TVC, AIT and others. In the first season of the show we visited 26 cities touching all the zones in Nigeria.

Season 2 
The second season of the show kicked off on Saturday 16 March 2019. It premiered with the prestigious city of Ikorodu in Lagos state with Veteran actor Babatunde Omidina popularly referred to as Baba Suwe with the amazing delicacy called Asaro (Yam Porridge). In the second season of the show we visited 26 cities covering all the zones in Nigeria.

References

Nigerian television talk shows